The 2005–06 Meistriliiga season was the 16th season of the Meistriliiga, the top level of ice hockey in Estonia. Five teams participated in the league, and HK Stars Tallinn won the championship.

Regular season

Playoffs

Semifinals 
 Tartu Välk 494 - Narva PSK 2:0 (11:2, 9:1)
 HK Stars Tallinn - HC Panter Tallinn 2:0 (6:3, 8:3)

3rd place
 HC Panter Tallinn - Narva PSK 2:0 (6:0, 4:2)

Final 
 Tartu Välk 494 - HK Stars Tallinn 0:3 (2:6, 5:6, 1:6)

External links
Season on hockeyarchives.info

Meistriliiga
Meistriliiga
Meistriliiga (ice hockey) seasons